The Chesapeake and Ohio H-8 was a class of 60 2-6-6-6 steam locomotives built by the Lima Locomotive Works in Lima, Ohio between 1941 and 1948, operating until the mid 1950s. The locomotives were among the most powerful steam locomotives ever built and hauled fast, heavy freight trains for the railroad. Only two were preserved; Nos. 1601 and 1604.

History
In 1939, the C&O was in the market for new locomotive power for its coal traffic. The railroad already had 40 Lima-built 2-10-4 T-1s from 1930 which ran across the largely level trackage in Ohio, while 45 2-8-8-2 H-7s dating back to 1924-1926 plodded away in mountainous territories of West Virginia and Virginia. Seemingly poised to order more Superpower T-1s, Norfolk & Western's success with their home-built Class A 2-6-6-4 prompted the C&O and Lima to consider a more modern articulated design. Design engineers at Lima argued that expanding the 4-wheeled trailing truck design to a 6-wheel design would permit an even larger firebox, leading to more steaming capability and, by extension, power. Thus was born the 2-6-6-6 wheel arrangement.

Having been sold on the Superpower philosophy through its experience with the T-1, the C&O went on to order 60 of the 2-6-6-6 type locomotives, which they designated the H-8, in 5 batches. The first 4 orders encompassed the first 45 locomotives and were delivered between 1941 and 1944, with the final order for 15 locomotives arriving in 1948. Cost per locomotive varied between individual orders, with the first order coming in around $230,600 per unit and the final order costing the C&O $392,500 per unit. Purchased with the intention of replacing the older H-7s on the New River and Alleghany subdivisions, the class received the nickname of "Allegheny".

Once on property, the H-8s were put to use on the railroad's heavy coal trains on both the flatlands of Ohio, supplementing the T-1s, and in the mountains of Virginia and West Virginia, replacing the H-7s which were then relegated to pusher service. Other assignments over the years included manifest freight and the occasional troop or passenger train. With the advent of dieselization in the early 1950s, retirement of the class started in 1952 and ran until the last fire was dropped in 1956.

Design and Performance
The H-8s were intended to be the ultimate expression of the Superpower concept from Lima. Utilizing the 6-wheel trailing truck design permitted the firebox of the locomotive to be longer and deeper, promoting enhanced coal combustion. The firebox was 180 inches in length, and was supplemented by a 118 inch combustion chamber. The boiler was designed to be the maximum possible size that could fit within C&O clearance envelopes. It sported an outside diameter of 109 inches, 2 inches wider than the Union Pacific Big Boy, carried 23-foot tubes and flues, a foot longer than Big Boy, and was designed with a maximum operating pressure of 265 psi in mind. In practice, the first safety valve was set at 260 psi. This, coupled with two sets of 22.5 inch diameter by 33 inch stroke cylinders and 67 inch drive wheels yielded 110,200 lbs of starting tractive effort, calculated at 85% efficiency. During test runs, the class was shown to exert up to 119,500 lbs of starting tractive effort with drivers worn to 65 & 1/2 inches. The 6-wheel trailing truck was designed to accommodate a booster engine which would have increased starting tractive effort by an additional 15,000 lbs, but the 160-car limit on trains on the C&O made the application of a booster to the H-8 unnecessary, and so the locomotives were never equipped. At this output, the locomotive could consume 7 to 8 tons of coal and 12,000 to 14,000 gallons of water per hour.

Water supply to the boiler was furnished by either the Nathan type 4000C Automatic Restarting injector, sized for 13,000 gallons per hour, on the engineer's side, or a Worthington type SA exhaust steam feedwater system. Locomotives 1600-1644 came equipped with the 6  1/2-SA, sized for 14,400 gallons per hour, while 1645-1659 were fitted with the 7-SA, sized for 16,200 gallons per hour. The locomotives sported the latest developments in steam technology, and came equipped with front-end multiple valve throttles, type E superheaters, schedule 8-ET brakes, low water alarms, continuous blowdown, automatic lubricators, etc. Baker valve gear controlled the admission of steam into the cylinders. The final batch of locomotives, 1645-1659, featured over-fire air jets in the firebox.

The H-8s also had the heaviest axle load of any steam locomotive, with 86,700 lbs on the lead drive axle. The earliest locomotives weighed in at a staggering 771,300 pounds in working order according to the engine profiles from C&O, although there are claims of engine weights as high as 778,000 pounds, which if true, would make them heavier than the second series of Big Boys. This unusually high weight led to adhesion factors exceeding 4.5, which meant that the locomotives were extremely sure-footed and unlikely to slip in regular service.

The tenders were equally unique. In order to ensure the locomotive would fit on the largest turntables on the C&O, but still carry enough fuel and water to make division points on the railroad, the tenders were made as short and as high as possible. This resulted in the use of a 6-wheel truck underneath the 25-ton coal bunker in combination with an 8-wheel truck underneath the 25,000 gallon water cistern. The tenders came in two classes. Class 25-RA tenders came equipped with Commonwealth trucks, weighed 437,600 lbs, and were only used on 1607-1609. The remaining balance of locomotives were delivered with class 25-RB tenders which came with Buckeye trucks and weighed either 426,100 lbs (1600-1606, 1610-1644), or 431,710 lbs (1645-1659).

Operation

Arriving just in time for the US entry into World War II, the locomotives were quickly assigned to power loaded coal trains over the 13-mile, 0.57% eastward climb from just east of Ronceverte, West Virginia to Alleghany, Virginia. 11,500-ton, 140-car loaded coal trains left Hinton, WV with two H-8s, one at the front and the other shoving from the rear, and typically made the run between Hinton and Alleghany in just under two hours, twice as fast as the H-7s they were replacing. These trains ran at a brisk 45 mph on the comparatively level track out of Hinton to Ronceverte before falling to 20 mph on the ruling grade to the summit. East of Clifton Forge, Virginia, trains were turned over to 2-8-4 K-4s. Running unassisted, H-8s could handle 6,500 tons of merchandise freight in this direction. Returning west from Clifton Forge, the ruling grade was 1.14% and the H-8s were rated for 2,950 tons of empty coal hoppers and manifest freight unassisted.

The H-8s also handled coal trains and time freights from West Virginia to Columbus and Toledo, Ohio alongside the older T-1s. Here, the ruling grade was a slightly stiffer, but much shorter one-and-a-quarter mile of 0.7% trackage west through Limeville, Kentucky leading up to the bridge over the Ohio River, and the H-8s were rated for 13,500 tons unassisted. It was over this division that dynamometer car testing yielded the over-7,000 drawbar horsepower readings. The C&O operating department was rather conservative, placing a 160-car limit on train lengths across the railroad due to yard and siding track length and to prevent unwanted slack action during braking from snapping couplers and breaking trains apart. Were it not for this 160-car limit, the H-8s could have easily handled trains approaching 200 cars and 17,000 tons unassisted over this division, save for the helper districts at Limeville, KY and on the 15-mile 0.5% grade of Powell Hill (just north of Columbus, OH).

23 H-8s were equipped with steam piping for heating passenger trains, and did occasionally power passenger or troop trains. Their comparatively "tall" 67 inch drivers permitted speeds as high as 70 mph on these runs, while their increased tractive effort allowed them to run unassisted on trains with 12 or more cars that would otherwise have been double-headed, and still make good time over the division. H-8 powered military trains (troop, hospital, or prisoner) sometimes ran as long as 20-40 cars (1500-3000 tons).

No. 1642 boiler explosion
On June 9, 1953, No. 1642 suffered a crown sheet failure and subsequent boiler explosion due to a prolonged low water condition at Hinton, WV. The crew members were killed.  The locomotive was not rebuilt, as the class was undergoing retirement by then.

Preservation
Two Alleghenies have been preserved:

No. 1601 was retired in 1956 and donated to the Henry Ford Museum in Dearborn, Michigan where it has been on display indoors since. No. 1646 was originally earmarked for this purpose, but was replaced by the 1601 owing to 1646 still being on the reserve roster around the time of the donation.
No. 1604 was initially sent to C&O's scrap lines behind their diesel shops at Russell, Kentucky upon retirement. It was then donated to the Virginia Museum of Transportation in Roanoke in 1969 where it was displayed next to N&W 1218. On November 4, 1985, it was partially damaged by a flood, which washed away the ground under it and nearly turned the locomotive over. In 1987, parent company Norfolk Southern did a cosmetic overhaul on it at their Roanoke Shops before it was sent to Baltimore to be displayed as the centerpiece of the then Mount Clare Junction shopping center which was adjacent to the B&O Railroad Museum. In 1989, the shopping center donated it to the museum, where it presently resides. Its cab has been restored by museum volunteers.

Gallery

See also
Chesapeake and Ohio class T-1
Chesapeake and Ohio class K-4

References

Steam locomotives of the United States
Preserved steam locomotives of the United States
Simple articulated locomotives
H-8
Standard gauge locomotives of the United States
Freight locomotives
Lima locomotives
Railway locomotives introduced in 1941